Amyostaurida is a suborder of jellyfishes. It contains two families.

References 

 
Stauromedusae